Nemaha County is the name of two counties in the United States:

 Nemaha County, Kansas 
 Nemaha County, Nebraska